Daniel Hoffmann (born 27 October 1971 in Rostock, East Germany) is a German football coach and a former player. He played in the Bundesliga (five seasons with Hansa Rostock and 1860 Munich, totalling 70 games), and also in Turkey and Austria.

Honours
Hansa Rostock
 NOFV-Oberliga (East German Championship): 1990–91
 NOFV-Pokal (East German Cup): 1990–91

References

External links
 

1971 births
Living people
Sportspeople from Rostock
German footballers
East German footballers
German football managers
Association football goalkeepers
Germany under-21 international footballers
FC Hansa Rostock players
1. FC Lokomotive Leipzig players
TSV 1860 Munich players
Kocaelispor footballers
SK Sturm Graz players
SC Paderborn 07 players
Bundesliga players
2. Bundesliga players
DDR-Oberliga players
Footballers from Mecklenburg-Western Pomerania
German expatriate footballers
German expatriate sportspeople in Turkey
Expatriate footballers in Turkey
German expatriate sportspeople in Austria
Expatriate footballers in Austria